Baker Township is a township in Linn County, in the U.S. state of Missouri.

Baker Township has the name of Samuel Baker, a county commissioner.

References

Townships in Missouri
Townships in Linn County, Missouri